Stobart Motorsport is an offshoot of the Eddie Stobart Group. Under its title sponsorship, Stobart Motorsport supports various rally and motorbike teams.

VK M-Sport Ford Rally Team

The Stobart VK M-Sport Ford Rally Team is a rally team competing in the World Rally Championship. The team's principal is Malcolm Wilson, whose M-Sport operation runs Stobart as well as the Ford factory team and Munchi's Ford World Rally Team. The team competed under the Stobart banner from 2006 - 2012, when support was withdrawn.

British Rally Championship

British Superbike Championship

Gallery

See also
Stobart M-Sport Ford Rally Team

References

External links

World Rally official page
Superbike official page
Other teams official page

Ford Team RS